Piet Botha (18 July 1955 – 2 June 2019) was a South African musician and the frontman of the South African rock band Jack Hammer (in which he was known as "The Hammer"), which has been an opening act for bands such as ZZ Top, Deep Purple and Uriah Heep. He also performed solo.

Biography 
He was the son of the South African Minister of Foreign Affairs Pik Botha (1932-2018) and the uncle of Roelof Botha, former CFO of PayPal.

Botha went to the US in 1985 to work, but returned to South Africa the next year.

In 2011 Botha appeared in the television series "Wie Lê Waar" (Who Lies Where) on the Afrikaans TV channel kykNET. In the programme he visits the graves of famous Afrikaner icons and tells about their lives. The series led indirectly to the recording and release of "Spookpsalms", Botha's first solo album in eight years.

A documentary about the life of Piet Botha as a musician was released in 2019.

Death 
Botha was diagnosed with pancreatic cancer in early 2019, and died on 2 June 2019.  He was 63.

Albums
'n Suitcase Vol Winter, 1997 WILDEBEEST
Donkermaan
Sien Jou Weer
Marilyn Monroe
Suitcase Vol Winter
Van Tonder
Die Kind
Goeienag Generaal
Klein Bietjie Reën
In Die Transvaal
Staan Saam Burgers
Gipsey In Jou Oë
Kom Huistoe
Jan Skopgraaf, 1999 WILDEBEEST
Jan Skopgraaf
Haiku Vir Rooijan
Blues Vir Louise
Loftus Versfeld
Kankerreën
Slawereën
Allesverloren
Van Tonder deel II
Boomstraat
Laat Die Wiele Rol
Riemtelegram
Die Mamba, 2003 RHYTHM
Warm Heuning
Bye Bye My Darling
Man Met Kitaar
Die Mamba
O My Heiland
Al Die Stede
Skielik Somer
Die Gemmerbroodman
Bordello
Bosveldpad
Herfsgedagtes
Kitty
Jacob Klipkop
Jeffreysbaai (instrumental)
Spookpsalms 2011 Wolmer Rekords (independent)

Gallery

References

External links
Official site of Piet Botha
Official site of Jack Hammer
Biography of Piet Botha

1955 births
2019 deaths
Afrikaans-language singers
South African rock musicians
Afrikaner people
South African people of German descent